Lyuben Hristov Zidarov (23 December 1923 – 3 January 2023) was a Bulgarian illustrator and painter.

Life and career 
Born in Veliko Tarnovo, Zidarov got a passion for drawing since his school years, and in the late 1930s he created some of the first Bulgarian comic strips. He studied painting at the National Academy of Arts in Sofia, graduating in 1948. In 1950 he started his activity as an illustrator, collaborating with the children publications Septemvriiche and Slaveyche. He then specialized in illustrating books, including novels by Mark Twain, Robert Louis Stevenson,  Jules Verne, Oscar Wilde, Alexandre Dumas and collections of Hans Christian Andersen's fairy tales. 

Among his last high-profile assignments were the cover art illustrations of the Bulgarian 20th Anniversary edition of the Harry Potter book series in 2019. He died on 3 January 2023, at the age of 99.

References

External links
 Lyuben Zidarov at Rakursi.com

1923 births
2023 deaths
Bulgarian illustrators
Bulgarian painters
People from Veliko Tarnovo